Magisterial Palace may refer to:

a building within Fort St. Angelo
Grandmaster's Palace (Valletta)
Palazzo Vilhena
Palazzo Malta